Lorenzo Marcello or simply Marcello was the name of at least two ships of the Italian Navy named in honour of Lorenzo Marcello and may refer to:

 , a  launched in 1918 and discarded in 1928.
 , a  launched in 1937 and sunk in 1941.

Italian Navy ship names